The men's 1500 metres was an Olympic event for the fourth time at the 1908 Summer Olympics. The competition was held on July 13, 1908, and on July 14, 1908. The races were held on a track of 536.45 metres= mile in circumference. The event was won by Mel Sheppard of the United States, the second consecutive Games an American had won the event. Sheppard, like Jim Lightbody in 1904, would also win the 800 metres for a middle-distance double.

44 runners from 15 nations competed. NOCs could enter up to 12 athletes. There were eight heats of the first round, with the winners of those heats competing in the final.

Background

This was the fourth appearance of the event, which is one of 12 athletics events to have been held at every Summer Olympics. The only runner from 1904 to return was the champion, Jim Lightbody. Unlike the previous two Games, the field included some top runners in 1908. Harold A. Wilson had broken the world record in the British Olympic trials. His countryman George Butterfield had won the AAA one-mile title through 1905–07. John Halstead, Mel Sheppard, and Lightbody were among the top American runners.

Australasia, Belgium, Finland, Hungary, Italy, the Netherlands, Norway, and Sweden each made their first appearance in the event (though Australia had previously competed, in 1896). The United States made its fourth appearance, the only nation to have competed in the men's 1500 metres at each Games to that point.

Competition format

For the first time, the competition consisted of two rounds. In previous Games, there had never been more than 9 runners; now, there were 44. Eight unseeded semifinals were held, with anywhere between 3 and 9 runners in each. Only the top runner advanced. This format left many of the top runners out of the final.

Records

These were the standing world and Olympic records prior to the 1908 Summer Olympics.

In the second semifinal Mel Sheppard set a new Olympic record at 4:05.0 only to be improved in the next run by Norman Hallows, who ran 4:03.4. In the final Mel Sheppard equalized this time when he also ran 4:03.4.

Schedule

Results

Semifinals

The semifinals of the 1500 metres were the first competitions of the athletics programme held, on Monday, July 13, 1908. The fastest runner in each semifinal heat advanced to the final the next day while all other runners were eliminated.

Semifinal 1

Meadows, de Fleurac, Smith, and Lightbody all had the lead during the race. Sullivan won by six yards.

Semifinal 2

Butterfield and Lee were ahead of Sheppard and Halstead at the bell, but the American pair proved the better runners on the straight and passed the English duo. Sheppard's time set a new Olympic record, with Halstead just behind him clocking in at the old record time.

Semifinal 3

Lunghi was passed by Hallows on the last lap, who won by two yards. Both Hallows and Lunghi beat the Olympic record set by Sheppard in the previous heat; the pace caused the remaining four competitors to drop out.

Semifinal 4

McGough led for the greater part of the race, with Loney and Coe passing him late and battling to the finish. Loney won by two yards.

Semifinal 5

Raugeneau pulled up lame on the second lap, leaving Tait to win by fifty yards.

Semifinal 6

Deakin won by seventy-five yards.

Semifinal 7

Galbraith led most of the race, but was passed by Wilson, who won by 30 yards.

Semifinal 8

Braun, Dahl, and Crawford were the clear frontrunners for the entire race. Crawford pulled in front late, and won by four yards.

Final

The final was held on Tuesday, July 14, 1908. Crawford went out fast, leading for the first 500 metres before tiring badly. Wilson, Hallows, and Sheppard led out going into the final straight, but Sheppard's late burst powered him to the front. He won by about 2 yards and equalled the Olympic record that Hallows had set in the first round.

References

Sources
 
 
 

Men's 1500 metres
1500 metres at the Olympics